Gabriele Abate (born 19 August 1979) is an Italian male mountain runner, who won a medal at individual senior level  at the World Mountain Running Championships.

Biography
He also won a silver medal at individual senior level at the European Mountain Running Championships and others 17 medals with the national team at the world and European championships.

National titles
Abate won three national championships at individual senior level.
Italian Long Distance Mountain Running Championships
Individual: 2010, 2011, 2012

See also
 Italy at the World Mountain Running Championships
 Italy at the European Mountain Running Championships

References

External links
 
 

1979 births
Living people
Italian male long-distance runners
Italian male mountain runners
21st-century Italian people